Robert McHugh (born 16 July 1991) is a Scottish professional footballer who plays as a striker for East Kilbride. McHugh has previously played for Motherwell, Falkirk, Greenock Morton and Queen's Park, as well as loan spells with Queen of the South and Airdrieonians.

Career

Motherwell
Born in Glasgow, McHugh made his Motherwell debut when he came on as a substitute in a 2–0 win over Hibernian in May 2008.

McHugh scored his first Motherwell goal when he took the field as a substitute in an 8–1 win over Flamurtari in the Europa League second round, scoring Motherwell's eighth goal in that match. He also scored the first goal as Motherwell beat Inverness CT 3–2 after extra time in the third round of the 2009–10 League Cup.

On 21 January 2011, McHugh joined First Division side Partick Thistle on loan until 27 March 2011. However, a broken wrist meant the loan would not happen, and so he stayed at the Fir Park club.

On 26 March 2013, McHugh signed a new two-year contract with Motherwell, lasting until summer 2015.

On 2 June 2015, Motherwell announced that McHugh was amongst the players leaving the club, with his contract having expired.

Queen of the South (loan)
On 13 January 2014, McHugh signed a six-month loan with Dumfries club Queen of the South.

On 3 May 2014, McHugh scored a goal notable amongst supporters of Alloa Athletic by scoring a 95th-minute equaliser for Queen of the South against Cowdenbeath. McHugh's goal sent Cowdenbeath into the relegation play-offs and secured Alloa's place in the Championship.

His scoring form continued into the Scottish Premiership play-offs as he scored both goals in the 2–1 quarter-final first leg home win against Falkirk on 6 May 2014. Four days later he scored in the return leg as Queen of the South were knocked out 4–3 on aggregate after a 3–1 defeat.

Airdrieonians (loan)
On 31 March 2015, McHugh signed for Scottish League One club Airdrieonians on loan until the end of the 2014–15 season. He made his debut on 4 April 2015, in a 2–0 win away to Stirling Albion.

Falkirk
On 14 July 2015, McHugh signed for Falkirk, agreeing a two-year contract having played as a trialist for the club in friendlies against Drogheda United and Athlone Town, scoring twice in both matches. After his contract ended in May 2017, McHugh was released by the club.

Morton
McHugh subsequently signed a two-year contract with Scottish Championship side Greenock Morton on 2 June 2017. On 10 August 2019, he scored his first career hat-trick in Morton's 4–1 win at home against Alloa Athletic.

Queen's Park
After a third successful season at Cappielow, McHugh joined the newly professional Queen's Park in June 2020.

Career statistics

References

External links
Robert McHugh profile at Motherwell FC official website

1991 births
Airdrieonians F.C. players
Association football forwards
Falkirk F.C. players
Greenock Morton F.C. players
Living people
Motherwell F.C. players
Queen of the South F.C. players
Scottish footballers
Scottish Premier League players
Scottish Professional Football League players
Footballers from Glasgow
Queen's Park F.C. players
East Kilbride F.C. players
Lowland Football League players